Red and Orange Streak is a 1919 painting by Georgia O'Keeffe. She painted it in New York, after arriving there from Texas. In a letter to a friend, O'Keeffe wrote: "the whole thing—lit up—first in one place—then in another with flashes of lightning—sometimes just sheet lightning—and sometimes sheet lightning with a sharp bright zigzag flashing across—I … sat on the fence for a long time—just looking at the lightning."

References

Paintings by Georgia O'Keeffe
Paintings in the collection of the Philadelphia Museum of Art
1919 paintings